Pierre Bourgarit (born 12 September 1997) is a French rugby union player. His position is hooker and he currently plays for Stade Rochelais in the Top 14.

International career

International tries

Honours

Club 
 La Rochelle
European Rugby Champions Cup: 2021–2022

References

External links
Stade Rochelais profile
L'Équipe profile

1997 births
Living people
France international rugby union players
French rugby union players
Stade Rochelais players
Rugby union hookers